Rastatt is an electoral constituency (German: Wahlkreis) represented in the Bundestag. It elects one member via first-past-the-post voting. Under the current constituency numbering system, it is designated as constituency 273. It is located in western Baden-Württemberg, comprising the city of Baden-Baden and the district of Rastatt.

Rastatt was created for the inaugural 1949 federal election. Since 2013, it has been represented by Kai Whittaker of the Christian Democratic Union (CDU).

Geography
Rastatt is located in western Baden-Württemberg. As of the 2021 federal election, it comprises the independent city of Baden-Baden and the district of Rastatt.

History
Rastatt was created in 1949. In the 1949 election, it was Baden constituency 7 in the number system. In the 1953 through 1961 elections, it was number 189. In the 1965 through 1976 elections, it was number 193. In the 1980 through 1998 elections, it was number 177. In the 2002 and 2005 elections, it was number 274. Since the 2009 election, it has been number 273.

Originally, the constituency comprised the independent city of Baden-Baden and the districts of Rastatt and Bühl. In the 1980 through 1994 elections, it comprised the city of Baden-Baden, the Rastatt districts, and the municipalities of Ettlingen, Malsch, and Rheinstetten from the Landkreis Karlsruhe district. In the 1998 election, it lost the Rheinstetten municipality. It acquired its current borders in the 2002 election.

Members
The constituency has been held continuously by the Christian Democratic Union (CDU) since its creation. It was first represented by Wendelin Morgenthaler from 1949 to 1957, followed by Ludwig Kroll for one term. Hugo Hauser was representative from 1961 to 1976, followed by Bernhard Friedmann from 1976 to 1990. Peter Götz then served from 1990 to 2013. Kai Whittaker was elected in 2013, and re-elected in 2017 and 2021.

Election results

2021 election

2017 election

2013 election

2009 election

References

Federal electoral districts in Baden-Württemberg
1949 establishments in West Germany
Constituencies established in 1949
Baden-Baden
Rastatt (district)